Southern California (commonly shortened to SoCal) is a geographic and cultural region that generally comprises the southern portion of the U.S. state of California. It includes the Los Angeles metropolitan area, the second most populous urban agglomeration in the United States. The region generally contains ten of California's 58 counties: Imperial, Kern, Los Angeles, Orange, Riverside, San Bernardino, San Diego, Santa Barbara, San Luis Obispo and Ventura counties.

The Colorado Desert and the Colorado River are located on Southern California's eastern border with Arizona, and San Bernardino County shares a border with Nevada to the northeast. Southern California's southern border with Baja California is part of the Mexico–United States border.

Constituent metropolitan areas
Southern California encompasses eight metropolitan areas (MSAs), three of which together form the Greater Los Angeles Combined Statistical Area (CSA) with over 18 million people, the second-biggest CSA after the New York CSA. These three MSAs are: the Los Angeles metropolitan area (Los Angeles and Orange counties, with 13.3 million people), the Inland Empire (Riverside and San Bernardino counties, including the Coachella Valley cities, with 4.3 million people), and the Oxnard–Thousand Oaks–Ventura metropolitan area (0.8 million people). In addition, southern California contains the San Diego metropolitan area with 3.3 million people, Bakersfield metro area with 0.9 million, and the Santa Barbara, San Luis Obispo, and El Centro (Imperial County) metropolitan areas.

The Southern California Megaregion (or megalopolis) is larger still, extending northeast into Las Vegas, Nevada and south across the Mexican border into Tijuana.

Significance

Within Southern California are two major cities, Los Angeles and San Diego, as well as three of the country's largest metropolitan areas. With a population of approximately 4 million, Los Angeles is the most populous city in California and the second most populous in the United States. South of Los Angeles and with a population of approximately 1.4 million is San Diego, the second most populous city in the state and the eighth most populous in the nation.

The counties of Los Angeles, San Diego, Orange, Riverside, and San Bernardino are the five most populous in the state, and are among the top 15 most populous counties in the United States.

The motion picture, television and music industry are centered in the Los Angeles area in Southern California. Hollywood, a district of Los Angeles, gives its name to the American motion picture industry, which is synonymous with the neighborhood name. Headquartered in Southern California are The Walt Disney Company (which owns ABC), Sony Pictures, Universal Pictures, MGM, Paramount Pictures and Warner Bros. Universal, Warner Bros. and Sony also run major record companies.

Southern California is also home to a large homegrown surf and skateboard culture. Companies such as Vans, Volcom, Quiksilver, No Fear, Stüssy, RVCA and Body Glove are all headquartered here. Skateboarder Tony Hawk; surfers Rob Machado, Timmy Curran, Bobby Martinez, Pat O'Connell, Dane Reynolds, and Chris Ward live in Southern California. Some of the most famous surf locations are in Southern California as well, including Trestles, Rincon, The Wedge, Huntington Beach and Malibu. Some of the world's largest action sports events, including the X Games, Boost Mobile Pro, and the U.S. Open of Surfing, are held in Southern California. The region is also important to the world of yachting with premier events including the annual Transpacific Yacht Race, or Transpac, from Los Angeles to Hawaii. The San Diego Yacht Club held the America's Cup, the most prestigious prize in yachting, from 1988 to 1995 and hosted three America's Cup races during that time. The first modern-era triathlon was held in San Diego's Mission Bay in 1974. Since then, Southern California, and San Diego in particular, have become a mecca for triathlon and multi-sport racing, products, and culture.

Southern California is home to many sports franchises and networks such as Fox Sports Net.

Many locals and tourists frequent the Southern California coast for its beaches. Some of southern California's most popular beaches are Malibu, Laguna Beach, La Jolla, Manhattan Beach, and Hermosa Beach. Southern California is also known for its mountain resort communities, such as Big Bear Lake, Lake Arrowhead, and Wrightwood, and their ski resorts, like Bear Mountain, Snow Summit, Snow Valley Mountain Resort, and Mountain High. The inland desert city of Palm Springs is also popular.

Northern boundary

Southern California is generally considered the area of California south of the latitude 35°45', approximately one-third of the state, formed by the northern boundaries of San Luis Obispo, Kern, and San Bernardino counties, which are not exactly a straight line. Another definition for Southern California uses Point Conception and the Tehachapi Mountains as geographical landmarks for the northern boundary.

Following the acquisition of the territory of California by the United States, several pro-slavery politicians attempted to arrange the division of Alta California at 36 degrees, 30 minutes, the line of the Missouri Compromise. Instead, the passing of the Compromise of 1850 enabled California to be admitted to the Union as a free state, preventing the southern half California from becoming its own separate slave state.

Subsequently, Californians (dissatisfied with inequitable taxes and land laws) and pro-slavery Southerners in the lightly populated "cow counties" of southern California attempted three times in the 1850s to achieve a separate statehood or territorial status separate from Northern California. The last attempt, the Pico Act of 1859, was passed by the California State Legislature and signed by State Governor John B. Weller. It was approved overwhelmingly by nearly 75 percent of voters to form the proposed Territory of Colorado. This territory was to include a portion of the much larger Tulare County and all of San Luis Obispo County. The proposal was sent to Washington, D.C. with a strong advocate in Senator Milton Latham. However, the secession crisis following the election of Abraham Lincoln in 1860 and the subsequent American Civil War led to the proposal never coming to a vote.

In 1900, the Los Angeles Times defined Southern California as including "the seven counties of Los Angeles, San Bernardino, Orange, Riverside, San Diego, Ventura and Santa Barbara." This definition left out San Luis Obispo and Kern counties.

Southern California was the name of a proposed new state which failed to get on the 2018 California ballot. The ballot measure proposed splitting the existing state into three parts.

In December 2020, during the COVID-19 pandemic, the state government led by Governor Gavin Newsom divided the state into five regions for the purpose of issuing stay-at-home orders. The Southern California region consists of the following counties: Imperial, Inyo, Los Angeles, Mono, Orange, Riverside, San Bernardino, San Diego, San Luis Obispo, Santa Barbara and Ventura. Kern County was grouped with other counties of the San Joaquin Valley, California's central agricultural valley.

Urban landscape

Southern California consists of a heavily developed urban environment, home to some of the largest urban areas in the state, along with vast areas that have been left undeveloped. It is the third most populated megalopolis in the United States, after the Great Lakes Megalopolis and the Northeast Megalopolis. Much of Southern California is famous for its large, spread-out, suburban communities and use of automobiles and highways. The dominant areas are Los Angeles, Orange County, San Diego, and Riverside-San Bernardino, each of which are the centers of their respective metropolitan areas, composed of numerous smaller cities and communities. The urban area is also host to an international San Diego–Tijuana metropolitan region, created by the urban area spilling over into Baja California.

Travelling south on Interstate 5, the main barrier to continued urbanization is Camp Pendleton. The cities and communities along Interstate 15 and Interstate 215 are so interrelated that Temecula and Murrieta have as much connection with the San Diego metropolitan area as they do with the Inland Empire. To the east, the United States Census Bureau considers the San Bernardino and Riverside County areas, Riverside-San Bernardino area as a separate metropolitan area from Los Angeles County. Newly developed exurbs formed in the Antelope Valley, north of Los Angeles, the Victor Valley, and the Coachella Valley with the Imperial Valley. Also, population growth was high in the Bakersfield-Kern County, Santa Maria and San Luis Obispo areas.

Climate

Most of Southern California has a Mediterranean-like climate, with warm and dry summers, mild and wet winters, where cool weather and freezing temperatures are rare. Southern California contains other types of climates, including semi-arid, desert and mountain, with infrequent rain and many sunny days. Summers are hot or warm, and dry, while winters are mild, and rainfall is low to moderate depending on the area. Rain is infrequent, but is often heavy when it does occur, making flash floods an aspect of living in Southern California. This climatic pattern was alluded to in the hit song "It Never Rains (In Southern California)". While snow is very rare in lower elevations, mountains above  receive plentiful snowfall in the winter.

Since the first decade of the 21st century, droughts and wildfires have increased in frequency as a result of climate change.

Natural landscape

Southern California consists of one of the more varied collections of geologic, topographic, and natural ecosystem landscapes in a diversity outnumbering other major regions in the state and country. The region spans from Pacific Ocean islands, shorelines, beaches, and coastal plains, through the Transverse and Peninsular Ranges with their peaks, and into the large and small interior valleys, to the vast deserts of California.
Introductory categories include:
Category: Beaches of southern California
Category: Mountain ranges of Southern California
Category: Rivers of Southern California
Category: Deserts of California
Category: Parks in Southern California

Geography

Geographic features

 Angeles National Forest (Los Angeles, San Bernardino, & Ventura Counties)
 Antelope Hills (Kern County)
 Antelope Valley (Los Angeles & Kern Counties)
 Arroyo Seco (Los Angeles County)
 Bacon Hills (Kern County)
 Baldwin Hills (Los Angeles County)
 Ballona Wetlands (Los Angeles County)
 Big Bear Lake (San Bernardino County)
 Bissell Hills (Kern County)
 Black Hills (Kern County)
 Bolsa Chica Estuary (Orange County)
 Buena Vista Hills (Kern County)
 Buena Vista Lake (Kern County)
 Cajon Pass (San Bernardino County)
 Calico Mountains (San Bernardino County)
 Channel Islands (Santa Barbara, Ventura & Los Angeles Counties)
 Castaic Lake (Los Angeles County)
 Chino Hills (Orange, Los Angeles, Riverside & San Bernardino Counties)
 Coachella Valley (Riverside County)
 Colorado Desert (San Bernardino, Riverside, Imperial, & San Diego Counties)
 Colorado River (San Bernardino, Riverside & Imperial Counties, Baja California & Sonora)
 Conejo Valley (Los Angeles & Ventura Counties)
 Cucamonga Valley (San Bernardino & Riverside Counties)
 Cuyamaca Mountains (San Diego County)
 Death Valley (San Bernardino & Inyo Counties)
 Diablo Range (Kern County)
 Elk Hills (Kern County)
 Elkhorn Hills (San Luis Obispo County)
 El Mirage Lake (San Bernardino County)
 El Paso Mountains (Kern County)
 Greenhorn Mountains (Kern County)
 High Desert (Los Angeles, Kern, Inyo, & San Bernardino Counties)
 Horned Toad Hills (Kern County)
 Imperial Valley (Imperial County)
 Irish Hills (San Luis Obispo County)
 In-Ko-Pah Mountains (San Diego County)
 Inland Empire (Riverside & San Bernardino Counties)
 Jacumba Mountains (San Diego County)
 Jawbone Canyon (Kern County)
 Kern River (Kern County)
 La Jolla Cove (San Diego County)
 Laguna Mountains (San Diego County)
 Lake Arrowhead (San Bernardino County)
 Lake Casitas (Ventura County)
 Lake Elsinore (Riverside County)
 Lake Isabella (Kern County)
 Lake Perris (Riverside County)
 Lake Piru (Ventura County)
 Lakeview Mountains (Riverside County)
 Lake Webb (Kern County)
 Little San Bernardino Mountains (Riverside & San Bernardino Counties)
 Little Signal Hills (Kern County)
 Los Angeles Basin (Los Angeles & Orange Counties)
 Los Angeles River (Los Angeles County)
 Los Padres National Forest (Kern, Los Angeles, San Luis Obispo, Santa Barbara, & Ventura Counties)
 Lost Hills (Kern County)
 Low Desert (Imperial, San Diego, Riverside & San Bernardino Counties)
 Mojave Desert (Los Angeles, Kern & San Bernardino Counties)
 Mojave River (San Bernardino County)
 Mount San Antonio (Los Angeles County)
 New River (Imperial County, Mexicali Municipality)
 Nine Sisters (San Luis Obispo County)
 Ojai Valley (Ventura County)
 Orange Coast (Orange County)
 Oxnard Plain (Ventura County)
 Palomar Mountain (San Diego County)
 Palo Verde Valley (Riverside & Imperial Counties)
 Palos Verdes Peninsula (Los Angeles County)
 Panamint Range (Inyo County)
 Peninsular Ranges (San Diego, Riverside, & Orange Counties)
 Pleito Hills (Kern County)
 Point Loma (San Diego County)
 Point Mugu (Ventura County)
 Point of Rocks (Kern County)
 Pomona Valley (Los Angeles & San Bernardino Counties)
 Providence Mountains (San Bernardino County)
 Puente Hills (Los Angeles County)
 Pyramid Lake (Los Angeles County)
 Rand Mountains (Kern County)
 Rio Hondo (Los Angeles County)
 Rosamond Hills (Kern County)
 Saddleback Valley (Orange County)
 Salton Sea (Imperial & Riverside Counties)
 San Andreas Fault (All Counties)
 San Bernardino Mountains (San Bernardino County)
 San Bernardino National Forest (Riverside & San Bernardino Counties)
 San Bernardino Valley (San Bernardino County)
 San Diego Bay (San Diego County)
 San Diego River (San Diego County)
 San Emigdio Mountains (Los Angeles, Ventura, & Kern Counties)
 San Fernando Valley (Los Angeles County)
 San Gabriel Mountains (Los Angeles & San Bernardino Counties)
 San Gabriel River (Los Angeles County)
 San Gabriel Valley (Los Angeles County)
 San Jacinto Mountains (Riverside County)
 San Jacinto River (Riverside County)
 San Joaquin Valley (Kern County)
 San Luis Rey River (San Diego County)
 San Pedro Bay (Los Angeles County)
 San Rafael Mountains (Santa Barbara County)
 Santa Ana Mountains (Orange & Riverside Counties)
 Santa Ana River (San Bernardino, Riverside & Orange Counties)
 Santa Ana Valley (Orange County)
 Santa Catalina Island (Los Angeles County)
 Santa Clara River (Ventura County)
 Santa Clara River Valley (Ventura County)
 Santa Clarita Valley (Los Angeles County)
 Santa Margarita River (Riverside, Orange & San Diego Counties)
 Santa Monica Bay (Los Angeles County)
 Santa Monica Mountains (Los Angeles & Ventura Counties)
 Santa Rosa Mountains (Riverside, Imperial & San Diego Counties)
 Santa Susana Mountains (Los Angeles & Ventura Counties)
 Santa Ynez Mountains (Santa Barbara & Ventura Counties)
 Santa Ynez Valley (Santa Barbara County)
 Scodie Mountains (Kern County)
 Sequoia National Forest (Kern County)
 Shale Hills (Kern County)
 Sierra Nevada (Kern County)
 Sierra Pelona Mountains (Los Angeles & Kern Counties)
 Simi Hills (Los Angeles & Ventura Counties)
 Simi Valley (Ventura County)
 Sweetwater River (San Diego County)
 Tehachapi Mountains (Kern & Los Angeles Counties)
 Tejon Hills (Kern County)
 Temescal Mountains (Riverside County)
 Telephone Hills (Kern County)
 Temblor Range (Kern & San Luis Obispo Counties)
 Tijuana River (San Diego County)
 Topatopa Mountains (Ventura County)
 Turtle Mountains (San Bernardino County)
 Ventura River (Ventura County)
 Verdugo Mountains (Los Angeles County)
 Victor Valley (San Bernardino County)

Geology

List of major fault zones

Note: Plate boundary faults are indicated with a (#) symbol.

 Brawley Seismic Zone
 Chino Fault
 Elsinore Fault Zone
 Elysian Park Fault
 Garlock Fault
 Hosgri Fault
 Imperial Fault Zone
 Laguna Salada Fault
 Newport–Inglewood Fault
 Peninsular Ranges
 Puente Hills Fault
 Raymond Fault
 Rose Canyon Fault
 Salton Trough
 Salinian Block
 San Andreas Fault #
 San Cayetano Fault
 San Felipe Fault Zone
 San Gabriel Fault
 San Jacinto Fault Zone
 Santa Maria River Fault
 Santa Ynez Fault
 Shoreline Fault
 Ventura Fault
 White Wolf Fault
 Whittier Fault
 Yorba Linda Fault

Earthquakes
Each year, Southern California has about 10,000 earthquakes. Nearly all of them are too small to be felt. Only several hundred have been greater than magnitude 3.0, and only about 15–20 have been greater than  4.0. California as a whole enacted the Alquist Priolo Special Studies Zone Act in the wake of the 1971 San Fernando earthquake. The act prohibits new construction of residential buildings closer than 50 feet from a surface rupturing active fault zone. In addition, the act improved safety by requiring new structures (both residential and commercial) to be seismically retrofitted. It also required existing infrastructure to comply. 

Since 1972, numerous large magnitude earthquakes have struck Southern California with little widespread damage in part due to act. However, exceptions can be noted for epicenters that lie directly on top of densely populated regions such as the  6.7 1994 Northridge Earthquake and, to a lesser extent, the smaller  5.5 2008 Chino Hills earthquake. The Northridge earthquake occurred on a blind-thrust fault directly underneath the San Fernando Valley, which until the earthquake was previously undiscovered. Seismic retrofitting of existing and new construction is aimed to prevent damage and save lives in the aftermath of a major quake, but it cannot guarantee that buildings will be unscathed if the epicenter is relatively close-by.

Despite the act already in law, the 1994 Northridge earthquake was particularly destructive, causing a substantial number of deaths, injuries, and structural collapses. The quake caused the most property damage of any earthquake in U.S. history at an estimated $20 billion.

Many Southern California faults are able to produce a  6.7 earthquake or greater, such as the San Andreas Fault, which can produce  8.0 or greater. The largest known earthquake in California was the 1857 Fort Tejon earthquake that ruptured 200+ miles of the San Andreas Fault from Parkfield to Wrightwood. With a recurrence interval of roughly 150 years, this part of the San Andreas fault is well within its window to produce another large earthquake. Along with the southern section of the San Andreas (in the Palm Springs region, which hasn't ruptured in ~400 years), the entire Southern California portion of the San Andreas Fault is ready to produce a powerful earthquake in the near future.

While the San Andreas Fault is the most well known major earthquake producing fault in California, it is not the only one that can produce large magnitude events. Notable examples include the San Jacinto Fault (a splay of the San Andreas that runs directly under the I-10 & I-215 interchange), the Newport–Inglewood-Rose Canyon Fault (located adjacent to Sofi Stadium and responsible for Signal Hill), the Elsinore Fault (created Lake Elsinore), the Garlock Fault (which marks boundary between of the Sierra Nevada and the Mojave Desert), and the Hollywood fault (which is within feet of Capitol Records and is roughly parallel to Hollywood Boulevard.

The United States Geological Survey (USGS) has released a California earthquake forecast, which models earthquake occurrence in California.

List of earthquakes
This is a partial list of earthquakes in Southern California. For a full list, see List of earthquakes in California.

Note: Earthquakes with epicenters in the Los Angeles Metro Area are marked with the (#) symbol. Other earthquakes mentioned indicates shaking was felt in the region.

 1812 San Juan Capistrano earthquake #
 1812 Ventura earthquake
 1857 Fort Tejon earthquake
 1892 Laguna Salada earthquake
 1899 San Jacinto earthquake
 1918 San Jacinto earthquake
 1933 Long Beach earthquake #
 1940 El Centro earthquake
 1948 Desert Hot Springs earthquake
 1971 San Fernando earthquake #
 1979 Imperial Valley earthquake
 1968 Borrego Mountain earthquake
 1986 North Palm Springs earthquake
 1987 Superstition Hills earthquakes
 1987 Whittier Narrows earthquake #
 1991 Sierra Madre earthquake #
 1992 Big Bear earthquake #
 1992 Landers earthquake
 1994 Northridge earthquake #
 2008 Chino Hills earthquake #
 2010 Baja California earthquake
 2019 Ridgecrest earthquakes

Population

As of the 2020 United States Census, Southern California has a population of 23,762,904. Despite a reputation for high growth rates, Southern California's population has grown slower than the state average since the 2000s. This is due to California's growth becoming concentrated in the northern part of the state as result of a stronger, tech-oriented economy in the Bay Area and an emerging Greater Sacramento region.

Southern California consists of one Combined Statistical Area, eight Metropolitan Statistical Areas, one international metropolitan area, and multiple metropolitan divisions. The region is home to two extended metropolitan areas that exceed five million in population. These are the Greater Los Angeles Area at 17,786,419, and San Diego–Tijuana at 5,105,768. Of these metropolitan areas, the Los Angeles-Long Beach-Santa Ana metropolitan area, Riverside-San Bernardino-Ontario metropolitan area, and Oxnard-Thousand Oaks-Ventura metropolitan area form Greater Los Angeles; while the El Centro metropolitan area and San Diego-Carlsbad-San Marcos metropolitan area form the Southern Border Region. North of Greater Los Angeles are the Santa Barbara, San Luis Obispo, and Bakersfield metropolitan areas.

Cities

Los Angeles (with a population of approximately 3.9 million people) and San Diego (at nearly 1.4 million people) are the two largest cities in all of California and are among the top eight largest cities in the United States. In Southern California, there are also 14 cities with more than 200,000 residents and 48 cities over 100,000 residents. Many of Southern California's most developed cities lie along or in close proximity to the coast, with the exception of San Bernardino and Riverside.

Counties

Imperial
Kern
Los Angeles
Orange
Riverside
San Bernardino
San Diego
San Luis Obispo
Santa Barbara
Ventura

Literature 
Southern California is home to most popular and famous literature in the region. These books include California by Kevin Starr, Malibu Farm Cookbook by Helene Henderson, L.A. Noir by John Buntin, The Mountains of California by John Muir, The New California Wine by Jon Bonné, and My Hollywood by Mona Simpson. Most of them are well received and nominated for rewards.

Economy

Industries
Southern California has a diverse economy and is one of the largest economies in the United States. It is dominated by and heavily dependent upon the abundance of petroleum, as opposed to other regions where automobiles are not nearly as dominant, due to the vast majority of transport that runs on this fuel. Southern California is famous for tourism and the entertainment industry. Other industries include software, automotive, ports, finance, biomedical, and regional logistics. The region was a leader in the housing bubble from 2001 to 2007 and has been heavily impacted by the housing crash.

Since the 1920s, motion pictures, petroleum, and aircraft manufacturing have been major industries. In one of the richest agricultural regions in the U.S., cattle and citrus were major industries until farmlands were turned into suburbs. Although military spending cutbacks have had an impact, aerospace continues to be a major factor.

Major central business districts

Southern California is home to many major business districts. Central business districts (CBD) include Downtown Los Angeles, Downtown Riverside, Downtown San Bernardino, Downtown San Diego, and the South Coast Metro. Within the Los Angeles Area are the major business districts of Downtown Pasadena, Downtown Burbank, Downtown Santa Monica, Downtown Glendale and Downtown Long Beach. Los Angeles itself has many business districts, such as Downtown Los Angeles and those lining Wilshire Boulevard including Mid-Wilshire, the Miracle Mile, Downtown Beverly Hills and Westwood; others include Century City and Warner Center in the San Fernando Valley. The area of Santa Monica and Venice (and perhaps some of Culver City) is informally referred to as "Silicon Beach" because of the concentration of financial and marketing technology-centric firms located in the region.

The San Bernardino-Riverside Area maintains the business districts of Downtown San Bernardino, Hospitality Business/Financial Centre, University District which are in the cities of San Bernardino and Riverside.

In Orange County, has highly developed suburban business centers (also known as edge cities) including the Anaheim–Santa Ana edge city along I-5; and another, the South Coast Plaza–John Wayne Airport edge city that stretches from the South Coast Metro to the Irvine Business Complex; Newport Center; and Irvine Spectrum. Downtown Santa Ana is an important government, arts and entertainment, and retail district.

Downtown San Diego is the CBD of San Diego, though the city is filled with business districts. These include Carmel Valley, Del Mar Heights, Mission Valley, Rancho Bernardo, Sorrento Mesa, and University City. Most of these districts are located in Northern San Diego and some within North County regions.

Theme parks and waterparks

Los Angeles
 Dry Town Water Park
 Pacific Park
 Raging Waters San Dimas
 Six Flags Hurricane Harbor
 Six Flags Magic Mountain
 Universal Studios Hollywood

Orange County
 Disney California Adventure
 Disneyland
 Knott's Berry Farm
 Knott's Soak City
 Wild Rivers (water park)

Riverside & San Bernardino
 Castle Park
 Wet'n'Wild Palm Springs

San Diego
 Sesame Place San Diego
 Belmont Park
 Legoland California
 Legoland Waterpark
 San Diego Zoo
 San Diego Zoo Safari Park
 SeaWorld San Diego

Vineyard-Winery American Viticultural Area (AVA) districts
California wine AVA-American Viticultural Areas in southern California:

South Coast AVA
Cucamonga Valley AVA
Malibu-Newton Canyon AVA
Ramona Valley AVA
Saddle Rock-Malibu AVA
Temecula Valley AVA
Leona Valley AVA

Central Coast AVA
San Luis Obispo Coast AVA
Arroyo Grande Valley AVA
Edna Valley AVA
San Pasqual Valley AVA
Santa Maria Valley AVA
Santa Ynez Valley AVA
Sta. Rita Hills AVA
York Mountain AVA

Transportation

See: Category: Transportation in Southern California

Southern California is home to Los Angeles International Airport, the second-busiest airport in the United States by passenger volume (see World's busiest airports by passenger traffic) and the third-busiest by international passenger volume (see Busiest airports in the United States by international passenger traffic); San Diego International Airport, the busiest single-runway airport in the world; Van Nuys Airport, the world's busiest general aviation airport; major commercial airports at San Bernardino, Orange County, Bakersfield, Ontario, Burbank and Long Beach; and numerous smaller commercial and general aviation airports.

Six of the seven lines of the commuter rail system, Metrolink, run out of Downtown Los Angeles, connecting Los Angeles, Ventura, San Bernardino, Riverside, Orange, and San Diego counties with the other line connecting San Bernardino, Riverside, and Orange counties directly.

Southern California is also home to the Port of Los Angeles, the country's busiest commercial port; the adjacent Port of Long Beach, the country's second busiest container port; and the Port of San Diego.

Airports
The following table shows all airports listed by the Federal Aviation Association (FAA) as a hub airport:

Freeways and highways

Sections of the Southern California freeway system are often referred to by names rather than by the official numbers.

Public transportation

See: Category: Public transportation in Southern California

Antelope Valley Transit Authority
Big Blue Bus (Santa Monica)
Gold Coast Transit (Ventura County)
Golden Empire Transit (Bakersfield)
Los Angeles County Metropolitan Transportation Authority
Metrolink
North County Transit District (northern San Diego County)
Omnitrans (southwestern San Bernardino County)
Orange County Transportation Authority
Riverside Transit Agency (western Riverside County)
San Diego Coaster (Oceanside to San Diego)
San Diego Metropolitan Transit System
San Luis Obispo Regional Transit Authority
Santa Barbara MTD

Communication

Telephone area codes

213 – Central Los Angeles
310 – West Los Angeles, Inglewood, Santa Monica, South Bay and Catalina Island
323 – Overlay with 213
424 – Overlay with 310
442 – Overlay with 760
562 – Long Beach, Gateway Cities, and parts of northern Orange County
619 – most of San Diego County including San Diego
626 – most of San Gabriel Valley including Pasadena
657 – Overlay with 714
661 – Bakersfield, Santa Clarita, and Antelope Valley
714 – Northern Orange County (including Anaheim, Santa Ana, and Huntington Beach)
760 – Northern San Diego County (including Oceanside and Escondido), Imperial County, Coachella Valley, Blythe, Twentynine Palms, Victor Valley, Barstow, and Ridgecrest
805 – Santa Barbara, Ventura and San Luis Obispo Counties
818 – Eastern Conejo Valley, Crescenta Valley, San Fernando Valley including Glendale and Burbank
820 – Overlay with 805
840 – Overlay with 909
858 – Overlay with 619
909 – Southwestern San Bernardino County, eastern Los Angeles County, and portions of northwestern Riverside County
949 – Southern Orange County (including Irvine, Newport Beach, Laguna Niguel, and San Clemente)
951 – Western Riverside County including Riverside and Temecula

Colleges and universities

The Tech Coast is a moniker that has gained use as a descriptor for the region's diversified technology and industrial base as well as its multitude of prestigious and world-renowned research universities and other public and private institutions. Amongst these include five University of California campuses (Irvine, Los Angeles, Riverside, Santa Barbara, and San Diego), 12 California State University campuses (Bakersfield, Channel Islands, Dominguez Hills, Fullerton, Los Angeles, Long Beach, Northridge, Pomona, San Bernardino, San Diego, San Marcos, and San Luis Obispo); and private institutions such as the California Institute of Technology, Azusa Pacific University, Chapman University, the Claremont Colleges (Claremont McKenna College, Harvey Mudd College, Pitzer College, Pomona College, Scripps College, Claremont Graduate University and Keck Graduate Institute), Loma Linda University, Loyola Marymount University, Occidental College, Pepperdine University, University of Redlands, University of San Diego and the University of Southern California.

Parks and recreation areas
Numerous parks provide recreation opportunities and open space. Locations include:

National Park Service
Cabrillo National Monument
Carrizo Plain National Monument
Castle Mountains National Monument
Cesar E. Chavez National Monument
Channel Islands National Park
Death Valley National Park
Joshua Tree National Park
Mojave National Preserve
Santa Monica Mountains National Recreation Area
Major State Parks – including:
Anza-Borrego Desert State Park
Crystal Cove State Park
Cuyamaca Rancho State Park
Chino Hills State Park
Fort Tejon State Historic Park
Kenneth Hahn State Recreation Area
Mount San Jacinto State Park
Malibu Creek State Park
Red Rock Canyon State Park (California)
Topanga State Park
Major State Historic Parks – including:
California Citrus State Historic Park
El Presidio de Santa Barbara State Historic Park
La Purísima Mission State Historic Park
Los Encinos State Historic Park
Mission San Luis Obispo de Tolosa
Old Town San Diego State Historic Park
Rancho Los Encinos
Santa Susana Pass State Historic Park
Tule Elk State Natural Reserve
Watts Towers
Will Rogers State Historic Park

Sports

Major professional sports teams in Southern California include:

NFL (American football) Los Angeles Rams, Los Angeles Chargers
NBA (Basketball) Los Angeles Lakers, Los Angeles Clippers
MLB (Baseball) Los Angeles Dodgers, Los Angeles Angels, San Diego Padres
NHL (Ice hockey) Los Angeles Kings, Anaheim Ducks
MLS (Soccer) LA Galaxy, Los Angeles FC
NWSL(Soccer) Angel City FC, San Diego Wave FC
WNBA(Basketball) Los Angeles Sparks
Southern California also is home to a number of popular NCAA sports programs such as the UCLA Bruins, the USC Trojans, and the San Diego State Aztecs. The Bruins and the Trojans both field football teams in NCAA Division I in the Pac-12 Conference, and there is a longtime rivalry between the schools.

See also

Category: History of Southern California
Category: California ranchos – Southern California Counties categories
Category: Public transportation in Southern California
California earthquake forecast
California megapolitan areas
Geography of Southern California
Largest cities in Southern California
List of regions of California#Southern California
Megaregions of the United States
San Angeles
South Coast
Southern California Association of Governments

References

Further reading
 
 
 , focus on planning, infrastructure, water and business.
 , on Henry Edwards Huntington (1850–1927), railroad executive and collector, who helped build LA and southern California through the Southern Pacific railroad and trolleys.
 
  online
  excerpt and text search, covers military and industrial roles.
  revised edition online
 
 
 , a historical geography
  in JSTOR
 , covers 1880s–1940

External links

 California Historical Society Collection, 1860–1960 – USC Libraries Digital Collections
 Historical Society of Southern California

 
Megapolitan areas of California
Regions of California